The Leeuwin class is a two-ship class of hydrographic survey vessels operated by the Royal Australian Navy (RAN).  and  were ordered from NQEA Australia in 1996, and were commissioned in 2000. In addition to surveying duties, since 2001 both vessels have been used to supplement the RAN patrol force.

Design and construction

The ships have a displacement of 2,170 tons at full load. Main propulsion machinery consists of four GEC Alsthom 6RK 215 diesel generators, which supply two Alsthom electric motors, each driving a propeller shaft. A Schottel bow thruster is fitted for additional manoeuvrability.

Each ship was originally fitted with a STN Atlas 9600 APRA I-band navigational radar, now updated to Sperry Vision-Master FT dual X-band and S-Band radar system. The vessels are fitted with a Nautel C-Tech CMAS 36/39 hull-mounted omni-directional active sonar, updated to CMAS 30D configuration. In addition, the ships were originally fitted with  an Atlas Fansweep-20 multibeam echo sounder and an Atlas Hydrographic Deso single-beam echo sounder, and a Klein 2000 towed sidescan sonar array. These have been updated to a Teledyne Seabat T50 IDH Multi-Beam Echo-Sounder, ship specific Single-Beam Echo-Sounders, and an EdgeTech towed sidescan sonar. There are three sets of davits fitted; although normally used to carry the   survey boats, they can be configured for other small craft. In addition, they carry a RHIB and two utility boats. The Leeuwins are fitted with a helicopter deck for an AS 350B Squirrel helicopter, although lack long-term hosting facilities. They are armed with two single 12.7 mm machine guns.

The ship's company consists of 10 officers and 46 sailors. In addition, up to 5 trainees can be accommodated. The Leeuwins were the first RAN ships to use a multi-crewing concept, with three complements used to operate the two vessels. Both vessels currently operate with a permanent single complement each.

The two ships were ordered from NQEA Australia on 2 April 1996, and built at the company's shipyard in Cairns, Queensland. Construction of  commenced in August 1996, and she was launched in July 1997, while  was laid down in May 1997 and launched in June 1998. The vessels underwent a joint commissioning ceremony on 27 May 2000. The ships initially bore the pennant numbers "HS 01" and "HS 02" respectively, but these were changed in 2004 to "A 245" and "A 246".

Operational history
They operate in support of the Australian Hydrographic Office.

In late 2001, both ships began operations to supplement patrol forces and counter illegal immigration as part of Operation Relex, in addition to normal surveying duties. The survey ships were selected as they had greater range and seakeeping capabilities that the s. In January 2002, Leeuwin and Melville were repainted from white to grey.

Ships

Citations

References

External links
 

Leeuwin class survey vessels
Auxiliary research ship classes